Alexandru Andrași (born 13 May 1965) is a retired Romanian football midfielder. His brother, Iuliu was also a footballer, they played together at FC Brașov.

Honours
Steaua București
Divizia A: 1992–93
Cupa României: 1991–92

References

1965 births
Living people
Romanian footballers
Romanian people of Hungarian descent
Liga I players
FC Brașov (1936) players
FC Steaua București players
FC Rapid București players
Vác FC players
Nemzeti Bajnokság I players
Romanian expatriate footballers
Expatriate footballers in Hungary
Romanian expatriate sportspeople in Hungary
Association football midfielders

Romanian sportspeople of Hungarian descent